Louis Delétraz (born 22 April 1997) is a Swiss racing driver currently competing in the FIA World Endurance Championship and European Le Mans Series for Prema Orlen Team and in the IMSA SportsCar Championship for Tower Motorsport. He also competes in the  IMSA Michelin Endurance Cup with Wayne Taylor Racing with Andretti Autosport.

Additionally, Delétraz won the Formula Renault Northern European Cup in 2015, as well as being the defending two-time European Le Mans Series champion. He is the son of former Formula One and Le Mans 24 Hours driver Jean-Denis Delétraz.

Early career

Karting 
Delétraz began karting in his native Switzerland 2008, winning the Vega Trofeo Super Mini class the following year. Third-place finishes followed in the KF3 Bridgestone Cup Switzerland and Vega Trofeo Junior categories in 2010 before winning the latter championship in 2011.

Formula BMW Talent Cup 
Delétraz began his single-seater career in September 2012, racing in the Grand Final of the Formula BMW Talent Cup season, held at Motorsport Arena Oschersleben in Germany. He started each of the three races from Pole position, winning the second race of the event. In the final race of the weekend, Delétraz collided with fellow Swiss driver Ralph Boschung with both drivers retiring from the race. He was subsequently excluded from the event following an incident in the pit lane after the race.

Formula Renault 2.0

2013 
Delétraz graduated to Formula Renault for 2013, racing in the Formula Renault 2.0 NEC championship with Josef Kaufmann Racing. He finished the season in 19th place in the championship, with a best race result of fifth coming in the second race of the Silverstone meeting.

2014 
Delétraz continued with the team for a second FR2.0 NEC season in 2014. After winning the opening race of the season at Monza, he took a further four podium positions to finish runner-up in the championship, sixteen points behind Fortec Motorsports Ben Barnicoat. During the year, Delétraz also made his debut in the Eurocup Formula Renault 2.0 championship, taking part in the rounds at Spa-Francorchamps, Nürburgring and Paul Ricard as a guest driver.

2015 

In 2015, Delétraz stayed with Josef Kaufmann Racing for a third season, racing a dual campaign in both Eurocup Formula Renault 2.0 and Formula Renault 2.0 NEC. He won the Formula Renault NEC while he finished in the top3 in Eurocup Formula Renault 2.0.

In April 2015, Delétraz was announced as one of the four drivers selected to join the BMW Motorsport Junior Programme for 2015. As part of the initiative, he is due to contest three races of the Veranstaltergemeinschaft Langstreckenpokal Nürburgring series (VLN) for the manufacturer.

Formula Renault 3.5 Series/Formula V8 3.5 
Delétraz made his debut in the Formula Renault 3.5 Series at the fifth round of the 2015 season at the Red Bull Ring, driving for the returning Comtec Racing team. He graduated to the series full time with Fortec in 2016, finishing runner-up in the standings.

GP2 Series 
On 18 November 2016, it was announced that Delétraz would make his debut in the final round of the 2016 season with Carlin. He finished 26th in the overall standings with no points.

FIA Formula 2 Championship

2017 

In December 2016, after partaking in post-season testing with them, Delétraz signed to race full-time with Racing Engineering in  alongside Gustav Malja.

2018 

Delétraz switched teams for the 2018 season, moving to Charouz Racing System to partner former Ferrari Driver Academy member Antonio Fuoco. Having scored second places during the sprint races in Monaco and Le Castellet respectively, the Swiss driver ended up tenth in the championship.

2019 

In 2019 Delétraz moved to reigning teams champion Carlin with Honda junior driver Nobuharu Matsushita. He finished the season eighth in the standings with a best result of 2nd in both the Monaco and Silverstone sprint races.

2020 
For 2020, Delétraz returned to Charouz alongside Pedro Piquet. Having scored five podiums, Delétraz ended his final season in the category eighth overall.

Formula One 
In February 2016, Delétraz was confirmed as a member of Renault's young driver program.

In November 2018 it was announced that Delétraz would make his Formula One test debut with Haas F1 Team at the end-of-year Young Driver Test in Abu Dhabi. He completed 117 laps in the second day of the 2 day test.

In May 2019 it was announced that Delétraz would join Haas F1 Team as simulator driver for the remainder of the 2019 season. Delétraz continued as reserve and development driver for 2020. However, following Romain Grosjean's crash at the 2020 Bahrain Grand Prix, the team preferred to bring in its other development driver, Pietro Fittipaldi. The Swiss driver criticized this decision on social media. Haas team principal Guenther Steiner brushed off these criticisms, saying Fittipaldi deserved the seat, as he had more Formula One mileage than Delétraz. Louis Delétraz did not continue as a development driver with Haas for 2021.

Sportscar career

2020: Endurance debut 
Delétraz competed in the 2020 24 Hours of Le Mans Virtual and won it with Rebellion Williams eSports, driving the Oreca 07 in the LMP category alongside Raffaele Marciello, Nikodem Wisniewski and Jakub Brzezinski. In the same year, Deletraz also competed in the 2020 with the Swiss outift, Rebellion Racing, in the LMP1 category alongside Nathanaël Berthon and Romain Dumas. The team finished the race in P4.

2021: ELMS glory 
In 2021, it was announced that Delétraz would be competing with Team WRT in the European Le Mans Series in the LMP2 category alongside Robert Kubica and Ye Yifei. With three wins and a P2 finish, they clinched the 2021 European Le Mans Series championship in the LMP2 category. Alongside this, Delétraz competed in the 2021 8 Hours of Portimão in the FIA World Endurance Championship, finishing in P6. Additionally, Delétraz competed in the 2021 24 Hours of Le Mans with his European Le Mans series teammates. After leading the race with one lap to go, the car, with Ye Yifei behind the wheel, stopped down the hill past the Dunlop Bridge because of a broken throttle sensor creating an electrical short circuit that temporarily turned the engine's electronic control unit off. Because of this, the team had to retire the car. Finally, Delétraz competed in the 2021 8 Hours of Portimão in the FIA World Endurance Championship, finishing in P6.

2022: Successful ELMS title defence 
In 2022, it was announced that Delétraz would be competing with the Prema Orlen Team in the 2022 FIA World Endurance Championship and Prema Racing in the 2022 European Le Mans Series both on a full season basis. In the 2022 FIA World Endurance Championship, Delétraz finished in P5 in the LMP2 championship with a P2 finish in the 2022 24 Hours of Le Mans. In the 2022 European Le Mans Series however, Delétraz and his teammate, Ferdinand Habsburg clinched the LMP2 Driver's championship with 4 wins and a P3 finish in Spa. Alongside this, he also competed in the 2022 IMSA SportsCar Championship with Tower Motorsport in the LMP2 class. With two wins in Laguna Seca and Petit Le Mans and three podium finishes, Delétraz finished the season in 7th place with points counting towards the Michelin Endurance Cup, not the overall LMP2 championship.

2023 
In 2023, it was announced that Delétraz would be joining the Wayne Taylor Racing squad, driving the Acura ARX-06 GTP entry alongside Filipe Albuquerque and Ricky Taylor. He serves as a third driver, competing in the IMSA Michelin Endurance Cup in Daytona, Sebring and Petit Le Mans.  In the opening race at the 24 Hours of Daytona, Delétraz and his team finished in second, ending up 4.190 seconds behind the Meyer Shank Racing with Curb-Agajanian Acura entry.

For his European season, the Swiss driver would contest a campaign for Team WRT in the LMP2 category of the FIA World Endurance Championship, whilst also joining Racing Team Turkey in an attempt to defend his European Le Mans Series title for the second year in a row.

Karting record

Karting career summary

Racing record

Racing career summary

† As Delétraz was a guest driver, he was ineligible for championship points.
* Season still in progress.

Complete Formula Renault 2.0 Northern European Cup results 
(key) (Races in bold indicate pole position) (Races in italics indicate fastest lap)

Complete Eurocup Formula Renault 2.0 results 
(key) (Races in bold indicate pole position; races in italics indicate fastest lap)

† As Delétraz was a guest driver, he was ineligible for points.

Complete Formula V8 3.5 Series results
(key) (Races in bold indicate pole position; races in italics indicate fastest lap)

Complete 24 Hours of Zolder results

Complete GP2 Series results
(key) (Races in bold indicate pole position) (Races in italics indicate fastest lap)

Complete FIA Formula 2 Championship results
(key) (Races in bold indicate pole position) (Races in italics indicate points for the fastest lap of top ten finishers)

Complete 24 Hours of Le Mans results

Complete European Le Mans Series results
(key) (Races in bold indicate pole position; results in italics indicate fastest lap)

Complete FIA World Endurance Championship results

* Season still in progress.

Complete IMSA SportsCar Championship results
(key) (Races in bold indicate pole position; races in italics indicate fastest lap)

† Points only counted towards the Michelin Endurance Cup, and not the overall LMP2 Championship.

References

External links
 

1997 births
Living people
Sportspeople from Geneva
Swiss racing drivers
Formula Renault 2.0 NEC drivers
Formula Renault Eurocup drivers
Formula BMW drivers
World Series Formula V8 3.5 drivers
ADAC GT Masters drivers
GP2 Series drivers
FIA Formula 2 Championship drivers
24H Series drivers
24 Hours of Le Mans drivers
FIA World Endurance Championship drivers
Blancpain Endurance Series drivers
European Le Mans Series drivers
Carlin racing drivers
WeatherTech SportsCar Championship drivers
Josef Kaufmann Racing drivers
Fortec Motorsport drivers
Comtec Racing drivers
Charouz Racing System drivers
Rapax Team drivers
Racing Engineering drivers
Prema Powerteam drivers
W Racing Team drivers
Rebellion Racing drivers
Starworks Motorsport drivers
AV Formula drivers
Wayne Taylor Racing drivers
Andretti Autosport drivers